In ancient Roman religion and myth, Carmenta was a goddess of childbirth and prophecy, associated with technological innovation  as well as the protection of mothers and children and a patron of midwives. She was also said to have invented the Latin alphabet.

Background

The name Carmenta is derived from Latin carmen, meaning a magic spell, oracle or song, and also the root of the English word charm. Her original name was Nicostrate ("victory-army"), but it was changed later to honor her renown for giving oracles (Latin singular: carmen). She was the mother of Evander of Pallene (fathered by Hermes) and, along with other Greek followers, they founded the town of Pallantium which later was one of the sites of the start of Rome. Gaius Julius Hyginus (Fab. 277) mentions the legend that it was she who altered fifteen letters of the Greek alphabet to become the Latin alphabet which her son Evander introduced into Latium.
Carmenta was one of the Camenae and the Cimmerian Sibyl. The leader of her cult was called the flamen carmentalis.

It was forbidden to wear leather or other forms of dead skin in her temple which was next to the Porta Carmentalis in Rome. Her festival, called the Carmentalia, was celebrated primarily by women on January 11 and January 15. She is remembered in De Mulieribus Claris, a collection of biographies of historical and mythological women by the Florentine author Giovanni Boccaccio, composed in 136162. It is notable as the first collection devoted exclusively to biographies of women in Western literature.

See also
Theodontius

References

Primary sources
Ovid, Fasti i.461-542
Servius, In Aeneida viii.51
Solinus, Collectanea rerum memorabilium i.10, 13

Secondary sources
The Dictionary of Classical Mythology by Pierre Grimal, page 89 "Carmenta"
The Book of the City of Ladies, by Christine de Pizan, section I.33.2
The Lincoln Beacon, Lincoln, Kansas, United States of America "Carmenta" 16 September 1880.

External links
Roman Mythology
List of Minor Roman Gods
Dictionary of Greek and Roman Biography and Mythology, page 589 (v. 1)

Childhood goddesses
Creators of writing systems
Oracular goddesses
Roman goddesses